Gharanlugh may refer to:
Nerkin Gharanlugh or Martuni, a city in the Gegharkunik Province (marz) of Armenia
Verin Gharanlugh or Geghhovit, a town in the Gegharkunik Province of Armenia